Li of Jin may refer to:

Marquis Li of Jin (died 859 BC)
Duke Li of Jin (died 573 BC)